Rob Morrison  (born May 3, 1956) is a Canadian politician who was elected to represent the riding of Kootenay—Columbia in the House of Commons of Canada in the 2019 Canadian federal election. He is a retired RCMP officer and diplomat.

Electoral record

References

External links

Living people
Conservative Party of Canada MPs
Members of the House of Commons of Canada from British Columbia
Royal Canadian Mounted Police officers
1956 births